Major Joseph Croshaw (c. 1610-12–1667) was a planter living near Williamsburg in the Colony of Virginia. He was the son of Captain Raleigh Croshaw. He became a planter and lived a few miles from present-day Williamsburg, Virginia. On December 10, 1651, he patented land which became the plantation known as Poplar Neck:

Poplar Neck subsequently came to be owned by Colonel John West through West's marriage to Croshaw's daughter Unity.

Family

Croshaw married five times and had eight children:

1. The name of the first wife (m 1633) Matachanna Powhatan
 
 Mary Croshaw (1632-1687), married 1. Henry White; 2. Thomas Taylor.
 Richard Croshaw (1633-   )
 Rachel Croshaw (1635-1670), married 1. Ralph Graves (grandson of Captain Thomas Graves); and 2. Richard Barnes.
 Betty Croshaw (1636-1637)
 Unity Croshaw (1636-1669), married Colonel John West.
 Benjamin Croshaw (1640-1645), died young.
 Joseph Croshaw (1642-1650), died young.

2.  Widow Finch   

3.  Mrs. Anne Hodges (d.1663), widow of Augustine Hodges

4.  Mrs. Margaret Tucker (d.1664), widow of Daniel Tucker  

5.  Mrs. Mary Bromfield (d. bef. 28 May 1673), widow of Thomas Bromfield 

  Joseph Croshaw (1667-1682)

Croshaw died on April 10, 1667, the same day his will was written and recorded in York County, Virginia. The inventory of his estate was substantial and included numerous household objects made of both pewter and silver. One large silver tankard was valued at four pounds sterling (equivalent to about £330 in 2017). The inventory of 1668 also listed the Croshaw estate as having 1000 bricks manufactured either by their own servants or by transient laborers.

References

Sources
"Crowshaw", by Martha Woodroof Hiden; William and Mary Qtrly (2), XXI, pp265 70.
"General Historie", by John Smith, 1624, Vol III, pp 78 81, Vol IV, pp. 151 154.
"The Complete Works of Captain John Smith", edited by Philip L. Barbour; Vol II, University of North Carolina Press, Chapel Hill, NC, 1986.

1610 births
1667 deaths
Virginia colonial people
American planters